Suntaragaali is a 2006 Indian Kannada language romantic action film directed by Sadhu Kokila and written by Ranganath. Besides direction, Sadhu Kokila has composed the music and also enacted in a supporting role. The main cast includes Darshan, Rakshita and Ashish Vidyarthi besides Seetha, Umashree and Rangayana Raghu in other pivotal roles. Duniya Soori was the co-director of this movie.

The film was released on 17 February 2006 across Karnataka cinema halls and got mixed response from critics and the audience.

Cast

Soundtrack
The music of the film was composed by Sadhu Kokila.

References

External links
 
 Suntaragali - Rude and crowded 

2006 films
2000s Kannada-language films
Indian romantic action films
2000s romantic action films
2000s masala films
Films directed by Sadhu Kokila